Gary Brough is a Turks and Caicos Islands professional football manager. In 2011, he coached the Turks and Caicos Islands national football team.

References

External links
Profile at Soccerway.com
Profile at Soccerwpunter.com

Year of birth missing (living people)
Living people
Turks and Caicos Islands football managers
Turks and Caicos Islands national football team managers
Place of birth missing (living people)